Canham may refer to:

People 
 Arthur Canham (1867–1933), South Africa's first trade commissioner
 Charles D. W. Canham (1901–1963), American military commander
 Christopher Canham (born 1962), British sprint canoer
 Don Canham (1918–2005), American athlete, coach, and college athletics administrator
 Erwin Canham (1904–1982), American journalist and author
 Leigh Canham (born 1958), British scientist
 Marc Canham (born 1982), British footballer
 Marc Canham (born 1977), British music composer
 Marsha Canham (born 1951), Canadian writer
 Mitch Canham (born 1984), American baseball coach and former catcher
 Scott Canham (born 1974), English footballer
 Sean Canham (born 1984), English footballer
 Timothy Canham, American software engineer, software lead and operations lead for Ingenuity helicopter
 Tony Canham (born 1960), English footballer

Places 
 Mount Canham
 Canham Glacier